Bethel Broadcasting, Incorporated, doing business as KYUK, KYUK-FM and KYUK-TV is a non-profit corporation dedicated to serving the Yup'ik Eskimo and residents of populations of southwest Alaska with local, non-commercial public radio and television. KYUK is a National Public Radio and Alaska Public Radio affiliate and PBS member station through the Alaska One Public Television Network. KYUK is located in Bethel, Alaska a town situated on the banks of the Kuskokwim River within the Yukon/Kuskokwim Delta region of southwestern Alaska.

KYUK has maintained an archive of their programs and productions. The Archive has over 5,000 audio and video recordings from the mid-1970s to the present. The mission of the Archive is to preserve, organize, store and make accessible moving image and sound recordings produced by KYUK Television and Radio about the culture, language, history and contemporary life of Yup'ik people and residents of the region.

The contents of the Archive include local news footage, newscasts, long form documentaries and documentary production elements, instructional public affairs, feature magazine shows, and Yup'ik dance performance programs. Many programs were produced in both English and Yup'ik languages.

KYUK
KYUK is an AM public radio clear-channel station. It is licensed for 10 kilowatts on 640 kHz. It primarily features programming from National Public Radio and Native Voice One. The latter network occasionally airs a pair of network identification spots which originated from the station, featuring former news reporters Charles Enoch and Julia Jimmie. In these clips, Enoch and Jimmie reference nearby Tuntutuliak (the hometown of both), the station and its location on the Kuskokwim River.

KYUK claims to have been the first Native-owned and operated radio station in the United States when it first went on the air in 1971.

KYUK-FM
KYUK-FM is an FM public radio station broadcasting at 90.3 MHz. It plays music with different genres at different times of day. It went on the air in Bethel in December 2009.

Translators

References

External links
 

 
 
 

Alaska Public Radio Network
Bethel, Alaska
Entertainment companies of the United States
Native American radio
Non-profit organizations based in Alaska
Yupik